Jenna Lê is an American poet and medical doctor. A Minnesota-born daughter of Vietnam War refugees, Lê grew up outside Minneapolis and earned her B.A. in Mathematics from Harvard University and her M.D. from Columbia University. She lives and works in New York City.

She is the author of two full-length collections of poems, Six Rivers (NYQ Books, 2011), which was a Small Press Distribution Poetry Bestseller, and A History of the Cetacean American Diaspora (Indolent Books, 2018; first edition: Anchor & Plume Press, 2016), which won Second Place in the 2017 Elgin Awards. Her poetry, fiction, essays, book criticism, and poetry translations have been published widely.  Her book Six Rivers reflects on four actual rivers the Perfume, Mississippi, Charles and Hudson, and two conceptual ones, the Aorta and the Styx. Other poems draw parallels between the experience of migratory animals and human migrants.  A reviewer in the Minneapolis Star Tribune wrote that, "her work reminds us why poetry can be so exciting -- not because it shows us the world as we already know it, but because it takes the world we already know and makes it strange and new."

Le has been a Minnetonka Review Editor's Prize winner, a two-time Alpha Omega Alpha Pharos Poetry Competition winner, a William Carlos Williams Poetry Competition finalist, a Michael E. DeBakey Poetry Award finalist, a Pamet River Prize semifinalist, a four-time Pushcart Prize nominee, a Best of the Net nominee, and a Rhysling Award nominee. Since 2014 (after her Pharos Poetry Competition wins), Le has also served on the editorial board of The Pharos, the journal of the Alpha Omega Alpha Medical Honor Society.

References

External links

 ACR Bulletin
 Anchor & Plume Press
 andreablythe.com
 Lantern Review
 The Millions (mutual interview with novelist Laura Goode; re: spelling bees)
 Newtown Literary
 The Science Fiction and Fantasy Poetry Association blog
 www.stephaniehan.com‘s “Woman Warrior” feature
 The Southampton Review

Vietnamese women writers
Year of birth missing (living people)
Living people
Columbia University Vagelos College of Physicians and Surgeons alumni
American physicians
People from Minnesota
American women poets
Harvard University alumni
21st-century American women
21st-century Vietnamese women